Allenport is a borough on the Monongahela River in Washington County, Pennsylvania, United States and part of the Pittsburgh metropolitan area since 1950. The population was 483 at the 2020 census.

Geography

Government
The townspeople are represented by an elected mayor and borough council.

Demographics

As of the census of 2000, there were 549 people, 243 households, and 168 families living in the borough. The population density was 278.8 people per square mile (107.6/km2). There were 261 housing units at an average density of 132.5/sq mi (51.2/km2). The racial makeup of the borough was 99.27% White, 0.36% African American, and 0.36% from two or more races. Hispanic or Latino of any race were 0.36% of the population.

There were 243 households, out of which 19.8% had children under the age of 18 living with them, 55.6% were married couples living together, 9.9% had a female householder with no husband present, and 30.5% were non-families. 26.3% of all households were made up of individuals, and 16.0% had someone living alone who was 65 years of age or older. The average household size was 2.24 and the average family size was 2.69.

In the borough, the population was spread out, with 14.6% under the age of 18, 6.6% from 18 to 24, 29.0% from 25 to 44, 29.5% from 45 to 64, and 20.4% who were 65 years of age or older. The median age was 45 years. For every 100 females, there were 92.6 males. For every 100 females age 18 and over, there were 93.0 males.

The median income for a household in the borough was $28,462, and the median income for a family was $32,250. Males had a median income of $28,438 versus $26,563 for females. The per capita income for the borough was $17,702. About 6.5% of families and 7.8% of the population were below the poverty line, including 14.3% of those under age 18 and 3.7% of those age 65 or over.

Landmarks

Allenport is home to several major landmarks however, a primary landmark has not been officially determined and is debated throughout the community. Many consider the top societal landmark to be Jay's Tavern, a local bar and restaurant known for its exceptional cheeseburgers, wings, and raviolis. The town's largest physical landmark is AMROX, or American Iron Oxide Company. Which has been closed and also tore down to the ground

References

Boroughs in Washington County, Pennsylvania
Populated places established in 1816
Pittsburgh metropolitan area
Pennsylvania populated places on the Monongahela River
1816 establishments in Pennsylvania